Cuyón may refer to:

Places
 Cuyón, Aibonito, Puerto Rico, a barrio in Aibonito, Puerto Rico
 Cuyón River, a river in the U.S. commonwealth of Puerto Rico
 Cuyón, Coamo, Puerto Rico, a barrio in Coamo, Puerto Rico